Dharmana Prasada Rao is an Indian politician from the state of Andhra Pradesh. He is a Member of the Legislative Assembly (MLA) from Srikakulam. He is the Minister of Roads and Buildings (R&B) and a former Revenue minister of Andhra Pradesh.

Political career

Dharmana Prasada Rao is a politician and state leader of the YSR Congress Party (YSRCP) from Srikakulam district. Dharmana Prasada Rao won 5 terms as an MLA from Srikakulam Assembly Constituency, including the 2019 election.

He has served as Textiles, Sports, and Water Resource Minister in the cabinet of Nedurumalli Janardhana Reddy and Kotla Vijaya Bhaskara Reddy. He served as revenue ,minister in the cabinet of Y.S. Rajasekhar Reddy. He also served as Roads and Buildings Minister in the cabinet of N Kiran Kumar Reddy. He reached his current position from the position of Village councilor (Sarpanch).

In August 2012, he resigned from the cabinet ministry following a chargesheet by the Central Bureau of Investigation on him alleging corruption in VANPIC project.

He left Congress and joined YSRCP on 9 Feb 2014. He won the 2019 assembly elections to Gunda Lakshmi Devi of Telugu Desam Party.

VANPIC case 

In April 2012, the Central Bureau of Investigation (CBI) questioned Dharmana in relation to the disproportionate assets case, that it was investigating against Y. S. Jagan Mohan Reddy. CBI questioned the motives behind passing GOs, when he was the revenue minister, allocating land to several projects including VANPIC.

In August 2012, CBI filed a chargesheet naming Dharmana as accused number 5, along with Jagan Mohan Reddy, Nimmagadda Prasad, Mopidevi Venkataramana and others. In the chargesheet it alleged quid pro quo among the accused. Following the chargesheet, Dharmana has resigned from cabinet ministry. But, the then Chief Minister Nallari Kiran Kumar Reddy has not accepted the resignation. However, Dharmana has since stayed away from the cabinet meetings.

In January 2013, a CBI court has permitted the prosecution of the case.

References

External links 
 Profile on AP State Government website
 Assets declaration (2009)

Indian National Congress politicians from Andhra Pradesh
Corruption in Andhra Pradesh
State cabinet ministers of Andhra Pradesh
People from Srikakulam
Telugu politicians
People from Uttarandhra
YSR Congress Party politicians
Year of birth missing (living people)
Living people
Andhra Pradesh MLAs 2019–2024